The N20 road is a national primary road in Ireland, connecting the cities of Cork and Limerick. Buttevant, Croom, Charleville, Mallow and Blarney are major towns along the route. A short section of the route (from Limerick to Patrickswell) is motorway standard and is designated as the M20 Motorway.

Route

M20 Rosbrien Interchange (Limerick) to Patrickswell 
The route starts at junction 1 at the Rosbrien interchange (south of Limerick city) where it connects to the M7 and the N18 which together form the Limerick Southern Ring Road. The route continues from this interchange as motorway. This route was redesignated as motorway in August 2009. The route bypasses Dooradoyle and Raheen, through which the old N20 route used to run until the early 2000s. Interchanges and link roads connect to these locations. Two further interchanges are located on the motorway, at either end of Patrickswell. At the latter, the N20 route leaves the main road (which continues as the N21 to Tralee), so one must diverge from the motorway to stay on the N20. The former route of the N20 before the M20 opened is now classified as the R526.

N20 Patrickswell to Cork City
A wide two lane road brings traffic along the Croom bypass (prior to the opening of this bypass at a cost of €20 million on 12 July 2001, the route went through the town). Past this new section of road, narrow two-lane road commences, ending at Charleville. The route passes through the town, running along Main Street. The road between Charleville and Buttevant is of similar design. At Mallow a relatively high specification road is encountered, with an older bypass of the town (early 1990s) passing up the hill from it as dual carriageway. A viaduct brings the road across the Blackwater River and Valley. The rest of the route to Cork is of high quality wide two lane, with a section of 2+1 road (a pilot installation) south of Mallow. The route becomes dual carriageway on the approach to Cork. Junctions on this dual carriageway section are not numbered. New relief roads in Cork bring the route into the city centre while avoiding the winding streets through which the route ran until around 2000. The route terminates at the city center with two lanes going in each direction. The N20 also gives access to the Blackpool Shopping Center.

M20 motorway

Under the government's cancelled Transport 21 initiative, the Atlantic Corridor road project aimed to link Letterkenny to Waterford via Limerick and Cork with high quality roadway. A major part of this proposal involved the potential upgrading of the N20 route between Cork and Limerick.

It was to be constructed in two stages: a southern section and a northern section. It was hoped that this project would be progressed as a PPP scheme.

On 10 November 2011, owing to funding issues caused by the Irish financial crisis, the government announced that the planned completion of the M20 motorway was to be "shelved". By 2013, the National Roads Authority carried out an upgrade of signage along the N20, fueling speculation that it would be some time before plans for the proposed M20 were revisited.

In October 2017, then Taoiseach Leo Varadkar stated that the motorway project would be a "priority". By late 2021, it was reported that there would not be a decision on a preferred route until at least early 2022. The preferred M20 route was published in March 2022, with the projected €1.5 billion project dated to "2030 or beyond".

Junctions

See also
Roads in Ireland
National secondary road
Regional road

References

External links 
Roads Act 1993 (Classification of National Roads) Order 2006 – Department of Transport
Mallow to Croom scheme
M20 Cork to Limerick Motorway Scheme Public Consultation Brochure

20
Roads in County Limerick
Roads in County Cork